Alexandre da Silva (born 21 March 1974), better known by his nickname Chiquinho, is a Brazilian former professional footballer who played as a midfielder. Chiquinho usually played as a midfielder.

Career 
Chiquinho was born in Campinas, São Paulo, Brazil. He began his football career at local team União São João de Araras and was, in 1997, on the brink of sealing a transfer to German Bundesliga club Borussia Dortmund, after Dortmund was alerted to the player's talents by their former Brazil international Júlio César. This transfer did not work out as fellow Bundesliga side Borussia Mönchengladbach rushed through an agreement with União São João to sign the player on a three-year contract for 2.2 million DEM. Chiquinho became the first ever player from Brazil to play for the former UEFA Cup winner.

Originally played as left sided wing back by Mönchengladbach's managers (and subsequently labelled as a surplus), Chiquinho was just as unable to meet expectations when he was given some share of playing-time in midfield under then manager Hans Meyer. This resulted in Mönchengladbach's decision not to extend his deal and forced the player to join Rot-Weiß Oberhausen. He played for Oberhausen in between 2000 and 2002, after which he was transferred to Rot Weiss Ahlen. At Ahlen he spent another two years of his career before moving back to Oberhausen in 2004. However, this time he only spent one season there. In 2005, he moved to FC Superfund. In his first year at FC Superfund, Chiquinho played in 29 games and scored two goals. Between 2007 and 2009 he was contracted for Austrian Bundesliga side SK Austria Kärnten.

Career statistics

References

External links
 

1974 births
Living people
Brazilian footballers
Sportspeople from Campinas
Association football midfielders
Bundesliga players
2. Bundesliga players
Borussia Mönchengladbach players
Rot Weiss Ahlen players
Rot-Weiß Oberhausen players
Brazilian expatriate footballers
Brazilian expatriate sportspeople in Germany
Expatriate footballers in Germany